Toby Hendy (born 11 July 1995) is a science communicator and YouTuber who focuses on educational content relating to physics, mathematics and astronomy.

Early life and education

School 
Hendy attended Katikati College in the Bay of Plenty, New Zealand. In 2011 she was selected by the Royal Society of New Zealand as one of two national delegates to attend the USA International Space Camp in Huntsville AL. In 2012 she won first place in the secondary school category of the NZ Eureka Awards for Science Communication.

University 
Hendy obtained a Bachelor of Science, majoring in Physics and Mathematics, at the University of Canterbury. She was awarded an Aurora Astronomy Scholarship that enabled her to take an overseas trip to NASA's Jet Propulsion Laboratory, Caltech, Carnegie Observatory, UCLA, Macdonald Observatory Texas, University of British Columbia, NRC Observatory Victoria and CHFT Hawaii.

Hendy went on to do her Honours year at the Australian National University in Canberra. In 2017, Hendy started a PhD at ANU focusing on using nanoindentation to examine the mechanical response of plant cells to applied pressure. She was awarded a Westpac Future Leader's Scholarship. During her time as a PhD student she placed runner-up in the Australian national finals of the FameLab science communication competition for her presentation 'Poking Plants'. In 2018, Hendy discontinued her PhD studies to pursue YouTube full-time.

Career 
Hendy has been uploading videos to YouTube since high school.
In August 2020, Hendy announced that she is working on a mathematical stop-motion short film, 'Finding X', supported by the Screen Australia Skip Ahead initiative. It was released on 25 January 2022., 

In 2023, she appeared on season 5 of the travel game show Jet Lag: The Game, filmed in New Zealand for Nebula.

Awards 
 2020 Screen Australia Skip Ahead Grant
 2018 FameLab Australia runner-up
 2017 Westpac Future Leader's Scholarship
 2015 Haydon Prize for top graduating physics student
 2013 UC Aurora Astronomy Scholarship
 2012 NZ Eureka Awards for Science Communication

References

External links
 Tibees YouTube channel

1995 births
Living people
Science communicators
Australian YouTubers
University of Canterbury alumni
Australian National University alumni
Education-related YouTube channels
Australian women physicists
YouTube channels launched in 2011